Guide Rock may refer to:
Guide Rock (hill), a topographic feature in Webster County in south central Nebraska
Guide Rock, Nebraska, a village in Webster County, Nebraska, named after a nearby hill